Linus Lilliedahl (born 15 February 1994) is a Swedish professional golfer who plays on the PGA Tour Latinoamérica. In 2022, he was runner-up at the Argentine Open and the Argentina Classic.

Early life and amateur career
Lilliedahl was born in Nyköping and grew up in Sandviken. With both his parents golf instructors, he was a confident golfer by age three. At 15, he collected a title on the Skandia Tour, the domestic junior circuit.

Lilliedahl played college golf the University of Missouri between 2014 and 2017. Playing with the Missouri Tigers men's golf team he won the Tiger Intercollegiate his senior year, beating Hayden Buckley by one stroke. He was named Academic All-American in 2016 and 2017 and was on the Southeastern Conference Honor Roll in 2016 and 2017.

Professional career
Lilliedahl turned professional in 2018 and joined the Nordic Golf League. In 2019, he lost a playoff at the Landeryd Masters, and recorded a further five top-10 finishes.

Lilliedahl joined the PGA Tour Latinoamérica in 2020 after earning his playing privileges with a T4 finish at the PTLA Qualifying Tournament in Fort Lauderdale. The tour cancelled for much of 2020 and 2021 due to the Covid-19 pandemic, he played in the LocaliQ Series in the United States. His best result was a tie for 4th at The Classic at Callaway Gardens, two shots out of the Stoney Crouch-Hayden Shieh playoff that Crouch won. 

In the inaugural event of the 2023 PGA Tour Latinoamérica season, he held the lead at the Visa Open de Argentina and ultimately finished runner-up; one stroke behind Zack Fischer. The following week, he finished runner-up at the Neuquen Argentina Classic; three strokes behind Cristóbal del Solar.

Amateur wins
2009 Skandia Tour Regional #5 - Dalarna
2017 Tiger Intercollegiate

Source:

References

External links

Swedish male golfers
PGA Tour Latinoamérica golfers
Missouri Tigers men's golfers
Sportspeople from Gävleborg County
People from Sandviken Municipality
1994 births
Living people
21st-century Swedish people